The 1967 Northern Illinois Huskies football team represented Northern Illinois University as independent during the 1967 NCAA College Division football season. Led by 12th-year head coach Howard Fletcher, the Huskies compiled a record of 5–5. Northern Illinois played home games at Huskie Stadium in DeKalb, Illinois.

Schedule

References

Northern Illinois
Northern Illinois Huskies football seasons
Northern Illinois Huskies football